Reciprocal may refer to:

In mathematics

 Multiplicative inverse, in   mathematics, the number 1/x, which multiplied by x gives the product 1, also known as a reciprocal
 Reciprocal polynomial, a polynomial obtained from another polynomial by reversing its coefficients
 Reciprocal rule, a technique in calculus for calculating derivatives of reciprocal functions
 Reciprocal spiral, a plane curve
 Reciprocal averaging, a statistical technique for aggregating categorical data

In science and technology

 Reciprocal aircraft heading, 180 degrees (the opposite direction) from a stated heading
 Reciprocal lattice, a basis for the dual space of covectors, in crystallography
 Reciprocal length, a measurement used in science
 Reciprocating engine or piston engine
 Reciprocating oscillation in physical wave theory

Life sciences and medicine

 Hybrid (biology), in genetics, the result of a reciprocal pair of crossings, forming reciprocal hybrids
 Reciprocal altruism, a form of symbiotic relationship in evolutionary biology
 Reciprocal cross, a breeding experiment in genetics
 Sherrington's law of reciprocal innervation in the theory of muscle activation

Social sciences

 Reciprocal determinism, a theory in psychology

Linguistics

 Reciprocal construction, a construction in which agent and patient are in a mutual relationship

In reciprocal relationships

 Reciprocal license, a type of software licenses also known as copyleft
 Reciprocal link between two web pages
 Reciprocal Public License (RPL), a software license

See also
 Reciprocation (disambiguation)
 Reciprocity (disambiguation)